Tecia is a genus of moths in the family Gelechiidae.

Species
 Tecia albinervella (Kieffer & Jörgensen, 1910)
 Tecia confirmans (Povolný, 1990)
 Tecia kiefferi Kieffer & Jörgensen, 1910
 Tecia solanivora (Povolný, 1973)
 Tecia subalbata (Meyrick, 1931)
 Tecia venosa (Butler, 1883)

References

 
Gnorimoschemini